The 1931–32 United States collegiate men's ice hockey season was the 38th season of collegiate ice hockey in the United States.

Regular season

Standings

References

1931–32 NCAA Standings

External links
College Hockey Historical Archives

1931–32 United States collegiate men's ice hockey season
College